The discography of Push Baby (previously called Rixton), a British pop rock band. Their debut studio album, Let the Road, was released in March 2015. The album peaked at number 19 on the UK Albums Chart and number 32 on the US Billboard 200 chart. The album includes the singles "Me and My Broken Heart", "Wait on Me", "Hotel Ceiling" and "We All Want the Same Thing". The song "Me and My Broken Heart" reached number one on the UK Singles Chart and reached the Top 20 on the US Billboard Hot 100. Their second studio album, Wow, Big Legend, was released in July 2021.

Studio albums

Extended plays

Singles

Promotional singles

Music videos

Notes

References

Discographies of British artists